Otavice may refer to:

 Otavice, Croatia, a small village in the Dalmatian hinterland in Croatia
 Otavice, Slovenia, a small village in the Municipality of Ribnica, Slovenia